Crosseana crosseana is a species of minute freshwater snail with an operculum, aquatic gastropod mollusc or micromollusc in the family Tateidae.

Distribution
This species is endemic to New Caledonia, where it is currently only known from a seepage between Koumac village and Koumac River, in the north of the island.

See also
List of non-marine molluscs of New Caledonia

References

External links
 J.B. (1874). Description de Mollusques terrestres et fluviatiles, provenant de la Nouvelle-Calédonie. Journal de Conchyliologie. 22(2): 207-216
 Zielske S. & Haase M. (2015). Molecular phylogeny and a modified approach of character-based barcoding refining the taxonomy of New Caledonian freshwater gastropods (Caenogastropoda, Truncatelloidea, Tateidae). Molecular Phylogenetics and Evolution. 89: 171-181

Crosseana
Endemic fauna of New Caledonia
Gastropods described in 1874
Freshwater molluscs of Oceania